|}

The Prix Niel is a Group 2 flat horse race in France open to three-year-old thoroughbred colts and fillies. It is run at Longchamp over a distance of 2,400 metres (about 1½ miles), and it is scheduled to take place each year in September.

The race serves as a trial for the Prix de l'Arc de Triomphe, which is held at the same venue three weeks later.

History
A precursor of the race called the Prix de Chantilly was formerly staged at Chantilly in early September. It was open to horses aged three or older, and for a period its distance was 3,100 metres. It was subsequently transferred to Longchamp and run over 3,000 metres. It was shortened to 2,400 metres in 1952, and reduced to 2,300 metres in 1953.

The Prix de Chantilly was restricted to three-year-olds when a separate event was introduced for older horses in 1955. The new race was initially titled the Prix Henri Foy, and from this point the Prix de Chantilly was contested over 2,400 metres.

The race was cut to 2,000 metres in 1960, and restored to 2,400 metres the following year. It was switched to Chantilly in 1964, and returned to Longchamp with a length of 2,100 metres in 1966. It was extended to 2,200 metres in 1968.

The event was renamed in memory of Gaston Niel (1880–1970), a long-serving member of the Société d'Encouragement, in 1972. For several years the Prix Niel held Group 3 status. It was increased to 2,400 metres in 1979, and promoted to Group 2 level in 1987.

The Prix Niel became part of the Breeders' Cup Challenge series in 2010, with the winner earning an automatic invitation to compete in the Breeders' Cup Turf. It was removed from the series in 2012.

Twelve winners of the race have achieved victory in the same year's Prix de l'Arc de Triomphe. The first was Sica Boy in 1954, and the most recent Rail Link in 2006.

Prix Niel is eligible for geldings from 2020. Due to the 2019–20 coronavirus pandemic, 2020 Prix Niel are not run, and are replaced by the Grand Prix de Paris.

Records
Leading jockey since 1952 (4 wins):
 Yves Saint-Martin – Nelcius (1966), Akarad (1981), Sagace (1983), Mouktar (1985)
 Freddy Head – Taj Dewan (1967),  (1974), Gay Mecene (1978), Cariellor (1984)

Leading trainer since 1952 (11 wins):
 André Fabre – Cariellor (1984), Trempolino (1987), Subotica (1991), Carnegie (1994), Housamix (1995), Sagamix (1998), Valixir (2004), Hurricane Run (2005), Rail Link (2006), Cavalryman (2009), New Bay (2015)

Leading owner since 1952 (5 wins):
 HH Aga Khan IV – Akarad (1981), Mouktar (1985), Sinndar (2000), Dalakhani (2003), Behkabad (2010)

Winners since 1978

Earlier winners

 1952:
 1953: Shikampur
 1954: Sica Boy
 1955: Walhalla
 1956:
 1957: Amber
 1958: Upstart
 1959: Montrouge
 1960: Puissant Chef
 1961: Devon
 1962: Kistinie
 1963: Le Mesnil
 1964: Sigebert
 1965: Super Sam
 1966: Nelcius
 1967: Taj Dewan
 1968: Vaguely Noble
 1969: Belbury
 1970: Stintino
 1971: Arlequino
 1972: Hard to Beat
 1973: Dahlia
 1974: 
 1975: Anne's Pretender
 1976: Youth
 1977: Crystal Palace

See also
 List of French flat horse races

References

 France Galop / Racing Post:

 france-galop.com – A Brief History: Prix Niel.
 galopp-sieger.de – Prix Niel (ex Prix de Chantilly).
 horseracingintfed.com – International Federation of Horseracing Authorities – Prix Niel (2016).
 pedigreequery.com – Prix Niel – Longchamp.

Flat horse races for three-year-olds
Longchamp Racecourse
Horse races in France